The Ratones River is a river on Santa Catarina Island, in Santa Catarina state in southeastern Brazil.

See also
List of rivers of Santa Catarina

References
Map from Ministry of Transport

Rivers of Santa Catarina (state)